January 2015

See also

References

 01
January 2015 events in the United States